The Japanese musician Ryuichi Sakamoto has released over 20 solo studio albums, more than 10 live albums, several compilation albums, over 40 EPs and singles, and about 48 soundtracks. Several of the albums exist in both Japanese and internationally released versions, sometimes containing different track listings. Sakamoto has also released many video albums and music videos.

Albums

Solo studio albums

 A Released internationally in 1986, with an altered track listing, as Illustrated Musical Encyclopedia.

Remix albums

Live albums

Soundtrack albums

Compilation albums

Mini-albums

Singles and EPs

Video albums

Music videos

Other album appearances

Collaborations
With Toshiyuki Tsuchitori
 Disappointment-Hateruma (1975)

With Haruomi Hosono
 Paraiso (1978)

With Kakutougi Session
 Summer Nerves (1979)

With Danceries
 The End of Asia (1982)
 Chanconette Tedesche (1983)

With Robin Scott
 The Arrangement (1982, originally released as an EP and later expanded into a full album with album-free singles)

With Yōsuke Yamashita and Bill Laswell
 Asian Games (1993, live LP)

With Morelenbaum²
 Casa (2001)
 A Day in New York (2003)

With Carsten Nicolai, as alva noto + ryuichi sakamoto
 Vrioon (2002)
 Insen (2005)
 utp_ (2008, with Ensemble Modern)
 Summvs (2011)
 "Glass" (2018)

With Christopher Willits, as Willits + Sakamoto
 Ocean Fire (2007)
 Ancient Future (2012)

With Fennesz
 Cendre (2007)
 Flumina (2011)

With Taeko Onuki
UTAU (2010)

With Taylor Deupree
 Disappearance (2013)

With Taylor Deupree and Illuha, as Taylor Deupree / Illuha / Ryuichi Sakamoto
 Perpetual (2015)

Soundtracks

Guest appearances

References

External links

Discographies of Japanese artists
Rock music discographies